The Brong-Ahafo region was a region in southern Ghana. Brong-Ahafo was bordered to the north by the Black Volta river and to the east by the Lake Volta, and to the south by the Ashanti, Eastern and Western regions. The capital of Brong-Ahafo is Sunyani. Brong-Ahafo was created on 14 April 1959 from the then Western Ashanti and named after the dominant and native inhabitants, Akans, Brong and Ahafo. In 2019, as a result of the 2018 Ghanaian new regions referendum, the region was divided into three, namely Bono, Bono East and Ahafo regions, and ceased to exist.

Economy and tourism
Brong Ahafo is known for its large cocoa production and agribusiness industries. Brong-Ahafo contains many Akan cultural and wildlife attractions, but it is less known to tourists than the Ashanti or Central region. Attractions of Brong-Ahafo include Kintampo, with its waterfalls (Kintampo waterfalls) and nature reserves; Fiema, one of the communities which is home to the Boabeng-Fiema Monkey Sanctuary (a short distance outside Sunyani); national parks, Bui National Park and Digya National Park.

Education
Paul Yeboah is the founder of the Ghana Permaculture Institute. The Ghana Permaculture Institute is a non-profit organization in Techiman (Brong Ahafo Region, Ghana).  The purpose of the Institute is to train communities how to build and maintain stable food systems using Permaculture sustainable practices that restore, take care of local ecosystems, and to improve quality of life in rural and urban areas.

Universities in the area include the University of Energy and Natural Resources (UENR), Catholic University College of Ghana (CUCG), Anglican University of Technology (AnguTech), College of Science, Arts and Education (CSAE) and Sunyani Technical University.

Sports
The region is renowned for producing a lot of elite athletes. Asamoah Gyan, Emmanuel Agyemang-Badu and John Paintsil are just a few of the numerous prominent sports personalities the region has produced. Currently, the region houses three of the 16 teams in the Ghana premier league. Aduana Stars F.C. is the traditional team of the Dormaa Traditional Area and it is based in Dormaa Ahenkro. They were promoted into the league for the first time in 2009 and emerged champions of the Ghana premier league that same year. In 2010 the premier league was won by Berekum Chelsea F.C., a club which is based in Berekum. Aduana Stars won the 2017 Ghanaian Premier League. Bechem United F.C. is the third Ghana Premier League team from the Brong-Ahafo Region.

Districts

The Brong Ahafo region was created in April 1959. It contains 27 districts. They are made up of 8 municipal and 19 ordinary districts as follows:

Notable people

References

 
Regions of Ghana
1958 establishments in Ghana
States and territories established in 1959